Southern Kuki-Chin is a branch of Kuki-Chin languages. They are spoken mostly in southern Chin State, Myanmar and in southeastern Bangladesh.

Some languages formerly classified as Southern Kuki-Chin, including Khumi, Mro, Rengmitca, are now classified as Khomic languages by Peterson (2017).

VanBik (2009) and Peterson (2017) split Southern Kuki-Chin into the Asho and Cho branches.

Languages

Shö
Thaiphum
Daai
Müün (K'cho, Ng'meeng, Nitu, Hmong-k'cha, Ng'gah)
Kaang
Nga La
Welaung (Rawngtu)
Laitu
Ekai
Rungtu (Taungtha)
Songlai
Sumtu

References

Peterson, David. 2017. "On Kuki-Chin subgrouping." In Picus Sizhi Ding and Jamin Pelkey, eds. Sociohistorical linguistics in Southeast Asia: New horizons for Tibeto-Burman studies in honor of David Bradley, 189–209. Leiden: Brill.
VanBik, Kenneth. 2009. Proto-Kuki-Chin: A Reconstructed Ancestor of the Kuki-Chin Languages. STEDT Monograph 8. .

Further reading
So-Hartmann, Helga. 1988. Notes on the Southern Chin Languages. LTBA 11.2:98-119. (CLDF dataset on Zenodo )